The Legendary Swordsman is a Singaporean television series adapted from Louis Cha's novel The Smiling, Proud Wanderer. It was first broadcast on TCS-8 (now MediaCorp Channel 8) in Singapore in 2000. It stars Steve Ma, Fann Wong, Ivy Lee, Chew Chor Meng, Jacelyn Tay, Florence Tan, Chen Tianwen, Priscelia Chan & Zheng Geping as the casts of the series.

Differences between novel and drama
The plot deviates significantly from the original story. Notable differences include: Ren Yingying appearing much earlier in the series than her first appearance in the novel; Ren Woxing is killed by Yue Buqun instead of dying from a stroke; an additional subplot on a romance between Tian Boguang and Lan Fenghuang; Dongfang Bubai is given a greater role in the series as the ultimate villain as opposed to his role as a minor antagonist in the novel, in which he only appears in one chapter.

Cast
 Steve Ma as Linghu Chong
 Fann Wong as Ren Yingying
 Ivy Lee as Yue Lingshan
 Chew Chor Meng as Lin Pingzhi
 Jacelyn Tay as Dongfang Bubai
 Florence Tan as Lan Fenghuang
 Chen Tianwen as Tian Boguang
 Priscelia Chan as Yilin
 Zheng Geping as Yue Buqun
 Hong Huifang as Ning Zhongze
 Natalie Faye as Qiu Xueying
 Richard Low as Ren Woxing
 Li Haijie as Zuo Lengshan
 Huang Shinan as Xiang Wentian
 Rayson Tan as Liu Zhengfeng
 Liang Weidong as Qu Yang
 Huang Wenyong as Lin Zhennan
 Huang Shaoting as Lin Zhennan's wife
 Hong Peixing as Yu Canghai
 Jin Yinji as Mute Granny
 Brandon Wong as Lao Denuo
 Chen Junguang as Lu Dayou
 Li Zhizhou as Mu Gaofeng

Awards

Production
Ann Kok was initially selected to play Yue Lingshan but she rejected the offer. Jacelyn Tay also turned down her role as Dongfang Bubai initially, but retook her role after a telling-off by Steve Ma in the Singaporean media.

References

External links
 
 The Legendary Swordsman on Mediacorp website

Singaporean wuxia television series
Works based on The Smiling, Proud Wanderer
2000 Singaporean television series debuts
2000 Singaporean television series endings
Television series set in Imperial China
Television shows based on works by Jin Yong
Channel 8 (Singapore) original programming